The Petite Maine (also: Maine) is a river in western France. The lowermost 6 km up to Château-Thébaud is navigable.

References

Rivers of France
Rivers of Loire-Atlantique
Rivers of Vendée
Rivers of Pays de la Loire